"No More Days to Waste" is a song written by Michelle Leonard, Linda Karlstedt, Susanna Janjic, Klas Olofsson and Fredrik Landh for German pop-rock group Aloha from Hell's 2009 debut album No More Days to Waste. It was released as the album's third single on April 3, 2009. The song reached number fifty-nine in the German singles chart.

Track listings
CD Single
"No More Days to Waste (single version)" - 3:00
"No More Days to Waste (Time Tools radio version)" - 2:57

CD Maxi Single
"No More Days to Waste (single version)" - 3:00
"No More Days to Waste (Time Tools radio version)" - 2:57
"No More Days to Waste (Unplugged version) " - 2:57
"I'll Smash Your Mind (live) " - 3:28

Chart positions

References

External links
Aloha From Hell's official website

Aloha from Hell songs
2009 songs
Songs written by Michelle Leonard